Graafland is a Dutch surname. Notable people with the surname include:

Ronald Graafland, Dutch footballer
Eddy Pieters Graafland, Dutch footballer
Jan Graafland, Dutch footballer
Jhr. J.L.M.Graafland (Joan Leo Magdalenus Graafland), author of the  "Heraldische encyclopædie" with A. Stalins, 1925

See also
Graafland, South Holland, hamlet

Dutch-language surnames